NGC 7048 is a planetary nebula in the constellation of Cygnus. The bright star to the lower left of the nebula is a magnitude 10.5 star, designated TYC 3589-4652-1. The nebula is slightly brighter along the west and east sides. This planetary nebula has an apparent magnitude of 12.1. NGC 7048 was discovered by Édouard Stephan on 19 October 1878 using a 31.5-inch reflector.

The central star of NGC 7048 is thought to be a white dwarf. The planetary nebula itself has an elliptical shape; from its low surface brightness it is thought to be highly evolved.

References

External links
 NGC 7048 
 NGC 7048 from Kopernik.org

Planetary nebulae
7048
Cygnus (constellation)